Ampahimanga is a rural commune in Madagascar. It belongs to the district of Arivonimamo, which is a part of Itasy. The population of the commune was 16,184 in 2018.

References

Populated places in Itasy Region